Welford-on-Avon is a village situated some  west-south-west of Stratford-upon-Avon in the county of Warwickshire, England. The population was measured at 1,420 in the 2011 census. Until 1931, Welford-on-Avon was in Gloucestershire (as part of the Rural District of Marston Sicca), when it was transferred to Stratford-on-Avon Rural District. Since 1974 it has been part of the Stratford-on-Avon District. Welford sits within a meander of the river Avon, on the south bank of the river. The village maypole is one of the tallest in England (at 65 feet / 20 metres). It used to be wooden but was replaced by an aluminium pole after a lightning strike. There are three pubs and many Tudor half-timbered and thatched cottages, mostly close to the village church, which is in the oldest part of Welford. Historically there were two railway station within two miles of the centre of the village, Binton (1885-1949) and Milcote (1859-1966).

Welford-on-Avon Primary School
The primary school, on Headland Road, was rated 'Good' by Ofsted in 2021. In 1995, it won the Daily Telegraph's young newspaper of the year competition with its annual publication, The J3 Bugle.

Gallery

References

External links

An historical account, from the Victoria County History (1949)
www.geograph.co.uk : photos of Welford-on-Avon and surrounding area
Welford-on-Avon Website

Villages in Warwickshire